Ojstriška Vas is a village in the Municipality of Tabor in central Slovenia. The area is part of the traditional region of Styria and is now included in the Savinja Statistical Region.

References

External links
Ojstriška Vas at Geopedia

Populated places in the Municipality of Tabor